Diego Adrián Celis (born 22 March 1992) is an Argentine footballer who plays as a forward for APIA Leichhardt.

Career
Making use of his dual citizenship, in 2020 he joined Chilean club San Marcos de Arica in the Primera B.

In 2022 he joined the Australian club APIA Leichhardt in the National Premier Leagues NSW.

Personal life
He also holds Chilean citizenship.

Career statistics
(correct as of 4 April 2017):

 Statistics are attributed to the Israeli league only

Honours
Vélez Sarsfield
Primera División (1): 2012–13 Inicial

References

External links
 
 
 Argentina national team up to Ramat Gan: Diego Celis is looking for a twist story (Hebrew) at Sport 5
 Diego Adrián Celis - Video 2016/17

1992 births
Living people
Footballers from Buenos Aires
Association football forwards
Argentine footballers
Argentine sportspeople of Chilean descent
Citizens of Chile through descent
Naturalized citizens of Chile
Chilean people of Argentine descent
Chilean footballers
Club Atlético Vélez Sarsfield footballers
Hapoel Bnei Lod F.C. players
Hapoel Ramat Gan F.C. players
Hapoel Iksal F.C. players
KF Bylis Ballsh players
San Marcos de Arica footballers
APIA Leichhardt FC players
Argentine Primera División players
Liga Leumit players
Kategoria Superiore players
Primera B de Chile players
Argentine expatriate footballers
Chilean expatriate footballers
Expatriate footballers in Israel
Expatriate footballers in Albania
Expatriate footballers in Chile
Expatriate soccer players in Australia
Argentine expatriate sportspeople in Israel
Argentine expatriate sportspeople in Albania
Argentine expatriate sportspeople in Chile
Argentine expatriate sportspeople in Australia
Chilean expatriate sportspeople in Israel
Chilean expatriate sportspeople in Albania
Chilean expatriate sportspeople in Australia